Barbara Goodson is an American voice actress who has done voice-over work in cartoons and shows. Her best-known role was providing the English dub voice of the main villain Empress Rita Repulsa in the Power Rangers franchise, starting with Mighty Morphin Power Rangers, and including Power Rangers Zeo, Turbo: A Power Rangers Movie, and Power Rangers in Space. 

Other Power Rangers characters she has played include Prince Sprocket and Orbus in Power Rangers Zeo, and Mandilok in Power Rangers Wild Force. She also voiced Red Fraggle and Wingnut in Jim Henson's cartoon Fraggle Rock, Ladyborg in Beetleborgs Metallix, and Mother Talzin on Star Wars: The Clone Wars, receiving for the latter a Best Actress award from the website Behind The Voice Actors.

She also voiced in HBO's Adventures of Tom Sawyer as Tom and FLCL as Naota. For her work in the series CloudBread, in which she is a cast member as Wooley, Ruiz, Grandma, and Teacher Ellie, she was nominated for Best Children's Programming in 2011 for an Annie Award. She was also awarded an Earphones Award for narrating Blair Clemons in the Time/Warner book On a Night Like This.

She is set to reprise her role as Rita Repulsa in a 30th anniversary Power Rangers special.

Personal life
 
Goodson was born in Brooklyn, New York. She grew up in New Jersey and now lives in Santa Monica, California with her husband Bruce Gustafson.

Filmography

Animation

 Avatar: The Last Airbender – Song's mother
 Bernadette: Princess of Lourdes – Various characters
 Buttons & Rusty – Buttons Bear
 Chucklewood Critters – Buttons, Christy, Frisky
 Fraggle Rock – Red Fraggle, Wingnut Doozer
 G.I. Joe: A Real American Hero – Various characters
 Goldengirl – Onyx, Moth Lady
 High Guardian Spice – Parnelle
 Jin Jin and the Panda Patrol – Jin Jin
 The Kids from Room 402 – Various characters
 Kissyfur – Various characters
 The Legend of Korra – Shaman
 LEGO Star Wars Terrifying Tales – Mother Talzin
 Lucky Luke – Three Hillbilly Women
 Miraculous: Tales of Ladybug & Cat Noir – Marianne Lenoir/Backwarder
 Mr. Pickles – Steve the Gimp
 OK K.O.! Let's Be Heroes – Small Calf Demon, Monster
 Saban's Adventures of Oliver Twist – Princess Annushka
 The Ren and Stimpy Show – High Fashion Log Girl
 The Secret Files of the Spy Dogs – Various characters
 Spider-Man: The Animated Series – Dr. Ashley Kafka
 Star Wars: The Clone Wars – Mother Talzin
 What's with Andy? – Various characters
 Wildfire – Various characters
 Wisdom of the Gnomes – Various characters
 The Wizard – Billy
 Wolf Rock TV – Mayor's Wife
 Alien Xmas – Z

Live-action

 Better than Us – Elena Vladimirovna (English Dub)
 Beetleborgs Metallix – Ladyborg (voice)
 Hallo Spencer – Galactica (voice)
 MMPR/PRZ/PRIS – Rita Repulsa (voice), Prince Sprocket, Orbus (voices, credited), Mantis, Somnibot, Turbanshell (voices, uncredited)
 Power Rangers Lost Galaxy – Icy Angel (voice)
 Power Rangers Time Force – Notacon (voice)
 Power Rangers Wild Force – Mandilok (Upper Mouth (Female Voice)) (voice)
 Violetta – Olga (voice: English dub)

Anime

 Ah! My Goddess: Flights of Fancy – Sentaro Kawanishi
 Ai Yori Aoshi – Aoi's Mother
 Angel Tales – Toki
 Arc the Lad – Boy, Boy B, Nurse, Old Woman, Waitress
 Armitage: Dual-Matrix – Yoko's Kindergarten Teacher
 Around the World with Willy Fog – Additional voices
 Bakuto Sengen Daigunder – Akira Akebono
 Barefoot Gen – Ryuta Kondo (Streamline Pictures)
 Battle B-Daman – Terry (2nd voice)
 B-Daman Crossfire – Derek Watari
 Biohunter – Mary
 Black Jack – Koichiro (young), Old Woman
 Blade of the Immortal – Fake Yaobikuni
 Bleach – Numb Chandelier
 Cardcaptors — Yuuki Tachibana
 Crimson Wolf – Mizuo Mashio
 Crying Freeman – Bayasan (Streamline Dub)
 Coppelion – Granny Ayame
 Cowboy Bebop – Pet Shop Owner
 Cyborg 009 – Cathy, Jimmy's Mother (2001 series)
 Daigunder – Akira Akebono
 Daphne in the Brilliant Blue – President
 DearS – Oihiko's Mom
 Demon Slayer: Kimetsu no Yaiba – Grandmother
 Digimon – T.K.'s Mom, additional characters
 Dogtanian and the Three Muskehounds – Milady
 Doomed Megalopolis – Keiko
 Dragon Ball – Son Goku (Zero) (Harmony Gold dub)
 Dual! Parallel Trouble Adventure – Akane Yamano
 El Hazard: The Magnificent World 2 – Various
 El Hazard: The Wanderers – Millie
 Ergo Proxy – Lacan
 Eureka Seven – Coda
 Fafner in the Azure – Ayano Kondou
 The Fantastic Adventures of Unico – Unico
 Final Fantasy: Legend of the Crystals – Queen Lenna
 Figure 17 – Rin Ibaragi
 FLCL – Nandaba Naota
 FLCL: Progressive – Tami Hanae
 Flint the Time Detective – Petra Fina/Mrs. Iknow, Getalong
 Fushigi Yūgi – Miboshi, Subaru
 Gad Guard – Kyoko Sanada
 Gate Keepers – Kazuko Ukiya
 Geneshaft – Hyun, Judy
 G-Force: Guardians of Space – Agatha June, Pee Wee
 Godzilla Singular Point — Tilda Mira
 Ghost in the Shell: Stand Alone Complex – Maruta, Prime Minister Yoko Kayabuki
 Grenadier – Teppa Aizen (boy)
 Grimm's Fairy Tale Classics – Various
 Gun Frontier – Erole
 Gurren Lagann – Kunba
 .hack//Legend of the Twilight – Katsuyuki
 Haré+Guu – Sharon
 Hello Kitty's Paradise – Moley
 Here is Greenwood – Mrs. Ikeda (Media Blasters dub)
 Honey and Clover – Aunt Akiko, Dr. Satsuki
 Honeybee Hutch – Various
 Hunter × Hunter 2011 series – Gon's Great-Grandmother Old Lady (Ep. 2)
 Immortal Grand Prix – Misaki
 JoJo's Bizarre Adventure: Stardust Crusaders – Enya Geil
 Jungle de Ikou! – Rongo/Takuma
 Kamichu! – Mitsubamaru
 Karas – Tsuruta
 Kekkaishi – Tokiko Yukimura
 Kikaider – Masaru Komyoji
 Knights of Sidonia – Lalah Hiyama
 Koi Kaze – Woman
 Kyo Kara Maoh! – Doria, Queen Bear Bee (Ep. 18), Rick, Conrad (Young)
 Leave it to Piyoko! – Additional voices
 The Legend of Black Heaven – Mother
 Little Women – Aunt March
 Love Hina – Mitsune Konno
 L/R: Licensed by Royalty – Sean
 Lupin III: The Castle of Cagliostro – Clarisse d'Cagliostro (Young; Streamline dub)
 Magi: The Labyrinth of Magic – Baba (Eps. 4 & 5)
 Magic Knight Rayearth – Alcyone, Sang Yung
 Mars Daybreak – Elizabeth Liati
 Maple Town – Bobby Bear, Mama Rabbit, Mikey Mole
 Megazone 23 – Yui Takanaka (Streamline Dub)
 The Melody of Oblivion – Bocca's Mother, Kei, Nurse, Old Woman, President
 Mermaid Forest – Old Lady
 Mobile Suit Gundam: The 08th MS Team – Maria
 Monster – Mrs. Fortner
 Moribito: Guardian of the Spirit – Torogai
 My Favorite Fairy Tales – Additional voices
 Naruto – Grandma Sansho
 Naruto Shippuden – Chiyo, Shima
 Neo-Tokyo – Mother
 The New Adventures of Gigantor – Jimmy Sparks
 Noozles – Blinky, Kelly Brown
 One-Punch Man – Boy (Ep. 8), Shibabawa (Ep. 9)
 Otogi Zoshi – Narrator
 Outlaw Star – Additional voices
 Overman King Gainer – Martina Lee, Woman in Restroom
 Ox Tales – Moe the Mole, additional characters
 Panda! Go, Panda! – Various 
 Paradise Kiss – Young George, Kozue Shimamoto
 Paranoia Agent – Sato
 Phoenix – Obaba, Boy
 Planetes – Fadlan's Daughter
 The Prince of Tennis – Sumire Ryuzaki
 Ramayana: The Legend of Prince Rama – Shoorpanakha
 Rave Master – Chino, Fortune Teller
 Resident Evil: Degeneration – (PFBC) Female News Reporter, Female Zombie 
 Ringing Bell – Chirin (lamb)
 Robot Carnival – Old Lady (Presence)
 Robotech – Marie Crystal, Sera (as Shirley Roberts)
 Rozen Maiden – Kazuki Shibasaki
 Rumiko Takahashi Anthology – Old Lady, Ruriko Tonegawa's Mother-in-law
 Rurouni Kenshin – Hana, Shougo and Saya's Mother
 Sailor Moon SuperS – Zirconia (Viz Media Dub)
 Samurai Champloo – Ogin, Madam, additional voices
 Samurai Girl Real Bout High School – Akira Kinomiya
 Scrapped Princess  Baroness Bairach, Rita
 S-CRY-ed – Banka, Emergy Maxfell (Young). Girl at Party, Mama-san, Ms. Yoshii
 Shin-chan (Phuuz dub) – Max 
 Shinzo – Additional voices
 Silent Möbius – Lebia
 Space Adventure Cobra – Jane
 Space Pirate Captain Harlock – Queen Regina
 Submarine 707R – Aldemis
 Tekkaman Blade – Star Summers
 Tenchi Muyo! GXP – Ryoko Balta
 The Third: The Girl with the Blue Eye – Ingrid
 The Twelve Kingdoms – Bishin, Gyokuyou, Takki
 Tweeny Witches – Credelle, Menow
 Twilight of the Dark Master – Takamiya
 Ultra Maniac – Bamboo
 Unico in the Island of Magic – Unico
 When They Cry - Higurashi – Keiichi's Mother/Aiko Maebara, Oryou Sonozaki, Suguru Okamura
 Wild Arms: Twilight Venom – Elizabeth, Ex Laila, Olivia, Pregnant Woman
 Windaria – Princess Veronica
 Witch Hunter Robin – Toudo's Mother
 Wolf's Rain – Hanabito
 Wowser – Bob Lovely, additional voices
 X – Saya Monou
 Yukikaze – Lynn Jackson
 Ys II: Castle in the Heavens – Bana
 Zillion – Apple
 Zillion: Burning Night – Apple

Films

 A Cat in Paris - Old Lady
 A Silent Voice – Ito Nishimiya
 Akira – Kaori, Takashi (Streamline dub), additional voices (Animaze dub)
 Aquarian Age the Movie – Hokuto
 Belle - Yoshitani
 Berserk: The Golden Age Arc III – Descent – Griffith (Young), Old Fortuneteller
 Birdboy: The Forgotten Children – Dinky's Mother, Mama Bir
 Laputa: Castle in the Sky – Pazu, Madge (original English dub) (as Bertha Greene)
 Cats Don't Dance – Various characters
 Catnapped! – Queen, Toru's Friend
 Cowboy Bebop: The Movie – Old Woman
 The Dalton on the Run – Additional Voices
 Fist of the North Star – Alei
 Fly Me to the Moon – Maggot 3
 Katy Caterpillar – Katy, Denise
 Kiki's Delivery Service – Kiki's Mother, additional voices (Streamline Dub)
 Lady and the Tramp II: Scamp's Adventure – Darling
 Lu over the Wall – Granny Octopus
 Metropolis – Emmy
 Mobile Suit Gundam F91 – Nadia Ronah
 Ringing Bell – Chirin (lamb) (uncredited)
 Rover Dangerfield – Farm Voices
 Tenchi Muyo!: The Daughter of Darkness – Child Yosho, Yuzuha
 The Bad Guys - Old Lady 
 The Fantastic Adventures of Unico – Unico (uncredited)
 Thumbelina: A Magical Story – Hoppy, Gladys (George's Wife/Hoppy's Mom), Croven, Aunt Ruth, The Human Witch, Bridesmaid #2 (uncredited)
 Unico in the Island of Magic – Unico (uncredited)
 Vampire Hunter D – Doris Lang (Streamline dub)
 Weathering with You – Fumi Tachibana (cameo)
 Zootopia – Bully

Video games

 Armored Core: Verdict Day – Various pilots, AI
 Brave Fencer Musashi – Kojiro
 Bugsnax – C.Clumby Clumbernut
 Dead Head Fred – Additional voices
 Demon Slayer: Kimetsu no Yaiba – The Hinokami Chronicles – Old Woman
 Final Fantasy VII Remake – Marle
 Final Fantasy XIII – Additional voices
 Fire Emblem Heroes – Hel
 Grim Fandango – Lola
 Guild Wars Nightfall – Spearmarshal Kormir
 Naruto Shippuden: Clash of Ninja Revolution 3 – Chiyo
 Naruto Shippuden: Legends: Akatsuki Rising – Chiyo
 Naruto Shippuden: Ultimate Ninja 4 – Chiyo
 Naruto Shippuden: Ultimate Ninja 5 – Chiyo
 Naruto Shippuden: Ultimate Ninja Heroes 3 – Chiyo
 Naruto Shippuden: Ultimate Ninja Storm 2 – Chiyo
 Naruto Shippuden: Ultimate Ninja Storm 3 – Chiyo
 Naruto Shippuden: Ultimate Ninja Storm 4 – Chiyo
 Naruto Shippuden: Ultimate Ninja Storm Revolution – Chiyo
 Nier Replicant ver.1.22474487139... – Lighthouse Lady
 Persona 5 Royal – Shinya Oda
 Power Rangers: Battle for the Grid – Rita Repulsa
 Resonance of Fate – Theresa
 Shenmue III – Additional Cast
 Space Adventure Cobra – Dominique Royal, misc.
 The Bureau: XCOM Declassified – Nurse Campbell
 Warcraft 3: The Frozen Throne – Lady Vashj
 World of Warcraft: The Burning Crusade – Lady Vashj (Boss)

Documentary
 Adventures in Voice Acting – Herself

References

External links

Goodson at the English Voice Actor & Production Staff Database

Actresses from New Jersey
American film actresses
American television actresses
American voice actresses
American video game actresses
Living people
People from Brooklyn
Queens College, City University of New York alumni
20th-century American actresses
21st-century American actresses
Year of birth missing (living people)